Annickia kummeriae is a species of plant in the Annonaceae family. It is endemic to Tanzania. The forests which this species is endemic to are suffering severe declines because of the use of the area for agriculture and gold mining.

References

Flora of Tanzania
Annonaceae
Vulnerable plants
Taxonomy articles created by Polbot
Taxobox binomials not recognized by IUCN